Alok Kanojia, also known as Dr. K. (born October 7, 1982), is an American psychiatrist and co-founder of the mental health coaching company, Healthy Gamer. He streams interviews on Twitch, where he and participants discuss mental health topics.

Early life 
Kanojia became addicted to video games during his time at the University of Texas at Austin, leading to missed classes and bad grades. At the age of 21, he moved to India to become a monk. He began studying alternative therapies including yoga, meditation, and Reiki in 2003 with particular attention to the Ayurvedic principle that mental health is inextricably linked to physical health. He got his addiction under control and graduated in 2007 with a biology major. He began a placement at Tufts University School of Medicine in 2010, receiving his medical degree in 2014, following which he started a residency at Harvard Medical School's MGH/McLean Adult Psychiatry Residency Program.

Career 
After graduation, Kanojia discovered that he had many friends who were also addicted to video games. He began helping them, but he soon realized that he didn't have the time to provide support to everyone. This prompted Kanojia and his wife Kruti to create a startup, Healthy Gamer, through which they could provide resources to help people overcome their addiction. He has stated that he believes gaming addiction is not typically treated productively by therapists and hopes to provide better support.

Kanojia started hosting group discussion sessions to talk about gaming and mental health and, finding that these were valuable to participants, began streaming on Twitch. He hosts live interviews mainly with other popular Twitch streamers where they discuss mental health issues. Guests of the show have included Reckful, Asmongold, Mizkif, xQc, and Pokimane. Kanojia also includes viewers who apply to be interviewed publicly on his livestreams. Some psychologists have raised concerns that, despite disclaimers stating that Kanojia's streams aren't therapy, they can still be perceived as such. Kanojia's streams are among the most popular mental health channels on Twitch due to his high-profile guests.

Healthy Gamer, which received support through an incubator at Boston University, trains coaches who provide non-medical advice and support to the gaming community. The coaches go through 10 weeks of free training and are paid to host individual and group sessions for paying customers, through which they explore attendees' goals and motivations and may provide guidance on meditation. The guides are not licensed medical professionals, and Kanojia encourages participants to continue with other support from trained psychiatrists or therapists.

Awards and nominations

References

External links 
 Healthy Gamer

American psychiatrists
Living people
Twitch (service) streamers
1982 births
University of Texas at Austin alumni
Tufts University School of Medicine alumni
American physicians of Indian descent